Escanaba and Lake Superior Railway may refer to:
Escanaba and Lake Superior Railway (1898–1901), predecessor of the Escanaba and Lake Superior Railroad
Escanaba and Lake Superior Railway (1880–1882), predecessor of the Chicago and North Western Railway